Abus may refer to:

 Abuş, a village in Mica Commune, Mureș County, Romania
 ABUS, a German maker of locks and padlocks
 Abus (bus operator), a public transport company in Bristol, England
 Abus (river), an old name for the Humber Estuary in England
 Abus gun, an early form of howitzer created by the Ottoman Empire
 Abus Valley, Antarctica
 Arbutus Biopharma, American biopharmaceutical company (NASDAQ stock symbol ABUS)
 Mount Ararat, Abus in ancient authors

See also
 Abuse (disambiguation)